A maven is an expert. The term may also refer to:

Science and technology
 Apache Maven, a software tool for build automation
 MAVEN, an orbiter mission to Mars
 Maven (Scrabble), a Scrabble-playing algorithm
 Project Maven, a US Department of Defense project utilizing AI to improve drone targeting

Other uses
 Maven (car sharing), a former carsharing service of General Motors
 Maven Networks, a multimedia company acquired by Yahoo!
 Mitsubishi Maven, a minivan sold in Indonesia since 2005

People
 Fred Mavin or Maven (1884–1957), English football player and manager
 Maven (wrestler) (born 1976), American professional wrestler
 Max Maven (1950–2022), American magician and mentalist

See also
 Mavin (disambiguation)